Thomas Benton Greenwood (July 2, 1872 – March 26, 1946) was a justice of the Supreme Court of Texas from April 1918 to December 1934.

References

Justices of the Texas Supreme Court
1872 births
1946 deaths